Dr. Nana Ayew Afriye is a Ghanaian politician and member of the Seventh Parliament of the Fourth Republic of Ghana representing the Effiduase-Asokore Constituency in the Ashanti Region on the ticket of the New Patriotic Party.

Early life and education 
Afriye was born on 22 January 1978 and hails from Effiduase in the Ashanti Region of Ghana. In 2004, he had his Bachelor of Medicine and Bachelor of Surgery from the University of Ghana and also a Post Graduate Certificate in Health Economics from the Oxford University. In 2009, he further had his MA in Economics Policy Management from the University of Ghana. In 2011, he had his MPH in Health Economics from the University of Leeds in UK.

Career 
Afriye was the CEO of St. Johns Hospital and Fertility located at Tantra Hills in Accra. He was also the Head Institutional Public Health at the Ridge Hospital.

Politics 
Afriye is a member of the New Patriotic Party and the member of parliament for Effiduase-Asokore Constituency in the Ashanti Region.

Committees 
Afriye is the Chairperson for the Health Committee and also a member of the Finance Committee.

Personal life 
Afriye is a Christian. He has three children.

References

Ghanaian MPs 2017–2021
1978 births
New Patriotic Party politicians
Living people
Ghanaian MPs 2021–2025